Glen Lough is a freshwater lake in the northwest of Ireland. It is located in north County Donegal near the village of Creeslough.

Geography
The Derryveagh Mountains begin on the lake's western side and the Glendowan Mountains begin on the lake's southern end.

Hydrology
Glen Lough is fed mainly by the Owencarrow River entering at its southern end. The lake drains northwards into the Lackagh River, which in turn enters Sheephaven Bay. The Owencarrow connects the lake with its southern neighbour, Lough Beagh.

Natural history
Fish species in Glen Lough include brown trout (including sea trout), Arctic char, salmon, minnow and the critically endangered European eel.

See also
List of loughs in Ireland

References

Lakes of County Donegal